Zackary is a given name. It is alternate spelling of Zachary. Notable people with the name include:
 Zackary Arthur (born 2007), American child actor
 Zackary Bowman (born 1984), American football cornerback
 Zackary Drucker (born 1983), American transgender multimedia artist
 Zackary Medeiros (born 1990), Canadian football kicker and punter
 Zackary Momoh, British-Nigerian actor
 Zackary Thomas Steffen (born 1995), American soccer player
 Zackary Wright (born 1985), American-born naturalized Bosnian-Herzegovinian basketball player

See also 
 Kate Zackary (born 1989), American rugby sevens player